Vexillum asperum is a species of small sea snail, marine gastropod mollusk in the family Costellariidae, the ribbed miters.

Description
The length of the shell attains 27.9 mm.

Distribution
This marine species occurs off the Philippines.

References

 Turner H. (2008) New species of the family Costellariidae from the Indian and Pacific Oceans (Gastropoda: Neogastropoda: Muricoidea). Archiv für Molluskenkunde 137(1): 105–125. [27 June 2008] page(s): 115

asperum
Gastropods described in 2008